Zhongxin is a town in Huaping County, Yunnan, China. It is the political, economic and cultural center of Huaping County.

Administrative division
As of 2016, the town is divided into nine villages and five communities:
 Xinglong Community
 Zhuping Community
 Liuxi Community
 Huaxing Community
 Xingmin Community
 Hedong
 Hexi
 Nanmu
 Suoluo
 Labi
 Longdong
 Tianping
 Zuocha
 Maluliangzi

History
In the Song dynasty (960–1279), the Tusi government set up a government office in the region. In 1382, in the 15th year of Hongwu period of the Ming dynasty (1368–1644), a Liuguan Office was established. In 1802, in the ruling of Jiaqing Emperor of the Qing dynasty (1644–1911), the army was stationed in the region.

After the establishment of the Republic of China in 1912, in came under the jurisdiction of the Centre District of Huaping County. It was officially named "Huazhong" in 1931 and was renamed "Zhuping" in 1937.

In September 1950, it belonged to the 1st District. Its name was changed to "Zhongxin" in 1953. During the Cultural Revolution, it was called "Xianfeng People's Commune" and then "Zhongxin People's Commune". In February 1983, it was renamed "Zhongxin District". It reverted to its former name of Zhongxin in March 1988, and the name has been used till the present day. In August 2005, the Longdong Lisu Ethnic Township was merged into the town.

Geography
The town is situated in the central Huaping County.

There are a number of popular mountains located immediately adjacent to the townsite which include Jiaoding Mountain (Baozi Rock, Tanshanping Mountain, and Longjin Mountain.

The Liyu River, Yubi River and Zuocha River flow through the town.

Climate
Spring, fall and winter are warm, while winter is relatively dry.

Economy
The economy of the town has a predominantly agricultural orientation, including farming and pig-breeding. Significant crops include rice, wheat and corn. The region also has an abundance of coastal, iron, copper, limestone, granite, graphite, kaolinite, and bauxite.

Demographics

In 2017, the local population was 47,403. The main ethnic groups in the town are Yi, Bai, Zhuang, Dai, Miao, Lisu, Hui and Nakhi.

Tourist attractions
The Immortal Cave is a famous scenic spot in the town, which is also known as a summer resort.

Transportation
The town is the terminal of China National Highway 305. 

The G4216 Expressway is a west–east highway in the town.

References

Bibliography

Divisions of Huaping County